Koshti Girchak (also Romanized as Koshtī Gīrchāk; also known as Koshtī Gīchāk and Koshtīgīr Chāk) is a village in Deylaman Rural District, Deylaman District, Siahkal County, Gilan Province, Iran. At the 2006 census, its population was 178, in 47 families.

References 

Populated places in Siahkal County